The Marshall Islands – Federated States of Micronesia Maritime Boundary Treaty is a 2006 treaty between the Marshall Islands and the Federated States of Micronesia (FSM) that delimits the maritime boundary between the two countries.

The treaty was signed in Majuro on 5 July 2006. The boundary set out by the treaty consists of ten straight-line maritime segments defined by 11 specific coordinate points in the ocean between the two island countries. The treaty was signed by FSM President Joseph J. Urusemal and Marshall Islands President Kessai Note.

The full name of the treaty is Treaty between the Federated States of Micronesia and the Republic of the Marshall Islands concerning Maritime Boundaries and Cooperation on Related matters.

References
"FSM signs treaties of extradition and maritime boundaries", FSM Information Service, 2006-07-12

2006 in the Marshall Islands
2006 in the Federated States of Micronesia
Boundary treaties
United Nations treaties
Treaties of the Marshall Islands
Treaties of the Federated States of Micronesia
Treaties concluded in 2006
Boundry
Marshall Islands–Federated States of Micronesia border